John W. Dawson Jr. (born February 4, 1944) is Professor of Mathematics, Emeritus at Pennsylvania State University at York. Born in Wichita, Kansas, he attended M.I.T. as a National Merit Scholar before earning a doctorate in mathematical logic from the University of Michigan in 1972. An internationally recognized authority on the life and work of Kurt Gödel, Professor Dawson is the author of numerous articles on axiomatic set theory and the history of modern logic. During the years 1982 to 1984, he catalogued Gödel's papers at the Institute for Advanced Study in Princeton, and afterward he served as a co-editor of Gödel's Collected Works. He recently retired as co-Editor-in-Chief of the journal History and Philosophy of Logic.

Books by Dawson
John W. Dawson Jr, 1997. Logical Dilemmas: The Life and Work of Kurt Gödel, A. K. Peters, Wellesley, MA, 
John W. Dawson Jr, 2015. Why Prove it Again? Alternative Proofs in Mathematical Practice, Springer, Chaim,

Additional publications
Dawson, John W. Jr. The published work of Kurt Gödel: an annotated bibliography. Notre Dame J. Formal Logic 24 (1983), no. 2, 255–284.

References

External links
Dr. John Dawson, personal webpage, Pennsylvania State University at York

1944 births
Living people
People from Wichita, Kansas
20th-century American mathematicians
21st-century American mathematicians
Mathematical logicians
American philosophy academics
American historians of philosophy
Set theorists
Massachusetts Institute of Technology alumni
University of Michigan alumni
Institute for Advanced Study visiting scholars
American book editors